This is a list of  Indonesia's official representatives and their placements at the Big Four international beauty pageants. The country has placed 27 times and won once:

One — Miss International crown (2017)

Hundreds of beauty pageants are conducted yearly, but the Big Four are considered the most prestigious, widely covered and broadcast by media. The Wall Street Journal, BBC News, CNN, Xinhua News Agency, and global news agencies such as Reuters and Agence France-Presse collectively refer to the four major pageants as "Big Four" namely: Miss Universe, Miss World, Miss International, and Miss Earth.

National franchises and organizations

The Indonesian franchise holders of the four major beauty pageants are the following:
 Datin Wira Poppy Capella Swastika — Miss Universe Indonesia for Miss Universe.
 Liliana Tanaja Tanoesoedibjo — Miss Indonesia for Miss World.
 The Royal Highest Family of Surakarta Sunanate, Princess Mooryati Soedibyo and Princess Putri Kuswisnuwardhani — Puteri Indonesia for Miss International.
 Dr. Kishanty Hardaningtyas —  Putri Nusantara for Miss Earth.

History
Indonesia's representatives to the Miss Universe pageant in 1974, 1975, 1976 1977, 1980, 1982, and 1983 were chosen by a local pageant organizer. The title was awarded through the Ratu Indonesia Organization. In 1995, Puteri Indonesia took over the license. Later in 2023, Miss Universe Indonesia took over the license and select Indonesia's Miss Universe representative.

Indonesia's representatives to the Miss International pageant in 1960, 1968, 1969, 1970, 1974, 1975, 1976, and 1977 were chosen by a local pageant organizer. The title was awarded through the Puteri Remaja Indonesia Organization. In 2007, Puteri Indonesia took over the license.

Indonesia's representatives to the Miss World pageant in 1982 and 1983 were also chosen by a local pageant organizer. The title was awarded through the Ratu Indonesia Organization. In 2005, Puteri Indonesia took over the license and in 2006, Miss Indonesia was esthablished and started to send its winner to the Miss World pageant. In 2007, Miss Earth Indonesia was established and the winner would represent the country at the Miss Earth pageant. In 2022, Putri Nusantara took over the license and select one of the winner to be Miss Earth Indonesia.

Achievements 

Indonesia got its first Big Four placement in 1976 when Treesye Ratri Astuti advanced as one of the top 15 finalists of Miss International 1976. A year later, Indri Hapsari Soeharto secured the 2nd Runner-Up position at Miss International 1977. This was Indonesia's highest placement in any Big Four pageants until 2015 when Maria Harfanti also ended up as the 2nd Runner-Up at Miss World 2015. It was surpassed in 2017 when Kevin Lilliana won Miss International 2017, being Indonesia's highest placement and its only victory so far.

Indonesia has been dubbed as the rising powerhouse in pageantry in the 2010s as it consistently placed in Big Four pageants (except Miss Earth) during the decade. At Miss Universe, Indonesia has placed as one of the semi-finalists since 2013, except in 2017 and 2022 (unplaced) also 2021 (did not participate). Indonesia currently has a 10-year-long ongoing placement streak at Miss World since 2011, the longest by any country.
The country also won Beauty With A Purpose award consecutively from 2014 to 2017, a milestone that no other countries have done before. In 2021, Indonesia finally got its first Miss Earth placement by Monica Fransisca Antoinette Khonado after participated 17 years.

Indonesia's Big Four titleholders
Colour Key

× Did not compete
↑ No pageant held

Summary

Hosting

See also

Miss Universe Indonesia
Miss Indonesia
Puteri Indonesia
Putri Nusantara
Big Four international beauty pageants
List of beauty contests

References

External links

Puteri Indonesia
Miss Indonesia
Beauty pageants in Indonesia
Nations at beauty pageants